Antonio Colóm Mas (born 11 May 1978) is a Spanish professional road bicycle racer from Bunyola. He is a specialist in short stage races, having won the Volta a la Comunitat Valenciana in 2006, the Vuelta a Mallorca in 2004 and the Vuelta a Andalucía in 2002.

Career
Colóm began his career at Costa de Almería in 1999 and stayed there for three seasons, in which time he built a growing reputation as a climber, winning the mountains classification of the Setmana Catalana de Ciclisme in 2001. In 2002, Colóm moved to Relax, and it was here that he had an early breakthrough in winning the Vuelta a Andalucía. Colóm moved to the division one team Illes Balears-Banesto in 2004 and once again saw early success, winning the Vuelta a Mallorca. A second placing in the Volta a la Comunitat Valenciana rounded out a successful season. In 2005, Colóm once again saw success in Mallorca, winning the Trofeo Calvià. In 2006, Colóm reversed his 2004 results: placing second overall in the Vuelta a Mallorca and winning the Volta a la Comunitat Valenciana.

In 2007, Colom moved to Astana Pro Team, and once again showed well in Mallorca, winning the Trofeo Sóller. His 2008 campaign was poor, but got back to winning ways at the start of the 2009 season as he took one stage and the overall win in his "home race" with his new Team Katusha outfit.

On 9 June 2009 it was announced that he had been provisionally suspended from racing following a positive drug test. On 27 May 2010 the Spanish Cycling Federation suspended him for 2 years, effective 2 April 2009, declaring his results in the 2009 Vuelta al País Vasco void, but making him eligible to return to cycling on 2 April 2011.

In July 2014, Colom, competing as an amateur, won the 35-39 male age group at Ironman Frankfurt qualifying himself to compete at the 2014 Ironman World Championship in Hawai'i.

Major results

1999 – Amica Chips–Costa de Almería
2000 – Costa de Almería
2001 – Jazztel–Costa de Almería
Setmana Catalana de Ciclisme – Mountain competition winner
2002 – Relax–Fuenlabrada
Vuelta a Andalucía
2003 – Colchon Relax–Fuenlabrada
2004 – 
Vuelta a Mallorca – overall winner
Volta a la Comunitat Valenciana
2nd overall
Combination competition – winner
Stage 1 – winner
2005 – 
Trofeo Calvià
2006 – 
Volta a la Comunitat Valenciana
Overall winner
Stage 4 winner
Vuelta a Mallorca – 2nd
2007 – Astana
Trofeo Sóller
Critérium du Dauphiné Libéré
 Stage 5 winner

2009 – Team Katusha
Vuelta a Mallorca
Trofeo Sóller
Stage 3, Volta ao Algarve
Stage 8, Paris–Nice
2nd, Vuelta al País Vasco

References

External links
Unofficial Site

Sportspeople from Mallorca
Spanish male cyclists
1978 births
Living people
Doping cases in cycling
Spanish male triathletes
Spanish sportspeople in doping cases
Cyclists from the Balearic Islands